Basil Feilding, 6th Earl of Denbigh (3 January 1719 – 14 July 1800) was an English nobleman and courtier.

He was the son of William Feilding, 5th Earl of Denbigh, and Dutch noblewoman Isabella Haeck de Jong, daughter of Count Peter Haeck de Jong of Utrecht and Anna Maria van Weede tot Dijkveld en Ratelis. He succeeded to the title of 6th Earl of Denbigh on 2 August 1755. 

He married Mary Cotton, daughter of Sir John Cotton, 6th Baronet, and Jane Burdett, on 12 April 1757. Their first son was William Feilding, Viscount Feilding. Their second son was Charles John Fielding, born 20 December 1761, who published a poem dedicated to his brother titled The Brothers, an Ecologue (1781).

In 1779 Charles prosecuted James Donally for highway robbery, who had accused him of sexual assault. He was educated at Trinity College, Cambridge, and died abroad unmarried. Basil married, secondly, Sarah Farnham, daughter of Edward Farnham, on 21 July 1783.

Feilding owned the Newnham Paddox estate in Warwickshire. He was Master of the Royal Harriers and Foxhounds from 1762 until March 1782, when the post was abolished. In 1773 Horace Walpole called him "the lowest and most officious of the Court-tools".

References

1719 births
1800 deaths
Earls of Denbigh
Desmond, Basil Feilding, 5th Earl of